Acroglochin is a genus of flowering plants in the family Amaranthaceae.

Taxonomy
The genus Acroglochin was first established in 1822 by Heinrich Schrader. Acroglochin was usually classified in subfamily Betoideae, because like all other Betoideae, the fruits are circumscissile capsules. But it proved to be phylogenetically isolated. The relationships are uncertain, it may probably be classified as a subfamily of its own. Molecular research in 2016 provided some evidence for the inclusion in subfamily Corispermoideae.

Species
, Plants of the World Online accepted three species:
Acroglochin muliensis (Soong) G.L.Chu
Acroglochin multiflora (Soong) G.L.Chu
Acroglochin persicarioides (Poir.) Moq.

References

Amaranthaceae
Amaranthaceae genera